Marcus Markou is a British film maker, playwright and internet entrepreneur.

Markou’s debut feature film Papadopoulos & Sons, starring Stephen Dillane, was completed in 2012. The film was self-distributed by Markou in UK cinemas in April 2013 achieving the second highest screen average of any film in that weekend. This success places the film among the top 5 self-distributed UK films in the past 15 years. The film went on to be bought by the BBC, ARTE and Netflix.

Markou’s approach to distribution included cold calling Greek Orthodox priests asking them to announce the film in their Sunday services

Markou speaks extensively about self distribution at film industry events and film festivals and is the subject of self distribution case studies.

His play Ordinary Dreams; Or How to Survive a Meltdown with Flair was staged in May 2009 at the Trafalgar Studios with actors James Lance and Adrian Bower. Age-Sex-Location, his play about chat rooms and virtual worlds, was staged at the Riverside Studios in 2004 with actor Ed Stoppard.

In 2014 Markou was nominated by the London Critics Circle Awards for Breakthrough British Filmmaker.

On 11 April 2018 it was announced that Marcus Markou was embarking in a new crowdfunding film and TV venture, along with US producer Cassian Elwes. Their company, dubbed Movie Collective, aims at financing film projects through an innovative crowdfunding approach that allows any investor to share the risk and the rewards, should a film be profitable.

References

External links
 
 Movie Collective : company's website

British dramatists and playwrights
Living people
Place of birth missing (living people)
British male dramatists and playwrights
Year of birth missing (living people)